Alla Yervandovna "Yervandi" Ter-Sarkisiants (April 25, 1937 – August 16, 2019) was a historian and ethnographer of Armenia, doctor of historical sciences, leading specialist of the Caucasus department of N. N. Miklukho-Maklai Institute of Ethnology and Anthropology of the Russian Academy of Sciences, and a corresponding member of the Russian Academy of Natural Sciences.

She finished her degree in history at Moscow State University in 1959. In 1968 she received her PhD from the N. N. Miklukho-Maklai Institute of Ethnology and Anthropology, and in 1998 she received Doctor of Historical Sciences title for her "The Armenians. History and ethno-cultural traditions" research. In 1978–1989 she was the secretary for science affairs of the N. N. Miklukho-Maklai Institute of Ethnology and Anthropology. Deputy chairman of Russian Humanitary Science Fund expert's council on history, archeology and ethnography.

Honors and awards
Certificates of merit from the Presidiums of USSR Academy of Sciences and Russian Academy of Sciences

Publications
She is an author of more than 150 academic publications, including:
 The modern family in Armenia. Moscow, Nauka, 1972. 208 p.
 Ethnocultural characteristics of Armenians of the North Caucasus // Studia Pontocaucasica. 2. Krasnodar, 1995. p. 5–31.
 The Armenians. History and ethno-cultural processes. Moscow, Vostochnaya literatura RAN, 1998. 397 p.
 The history and culture of Armenian People from the ancient times to the 19th century. Moscow, Vostochnaya literatura RAN, 2005. 686 p.

References

20th-century Russian historians
Armenian studies scholars
Armenian ethnographers
Moscow State University alumni
Russian people of Armenian descent
1937 births
2019 deaths
20th-century Russian women writers
21st-century Russian women writers
21st-century Russian historians